The 2006 California gubernatorial election occurred on November 7, 2006. The primary elections took place on June 6, 2006. The incumbent Republican Governor, Arnold Schwarzenegger, won re-election for his first and only full term. His main opponent was California State Treasurer Phil Angelides, the California Democratic Party nominee. Peter Camejo was the California Green Party nominee, Janice Jordan was the Peace and Freedom Party nominee, Art Olivier was the California Libertarian Party nominee, and Edward C. Noonan was the California American Independent Party nominee.

Under the state constitution, the Governor serves a four-year term, with a maximum or minimum term limit of two four-year terms for life, regardless of whether or not they are consecutive or nonconsecutive. Arnold Schwarzenegger was elected in a 2003 recall election and served out the remainder of predecessor Gray Davis's term ending in 2006; Schwarzenegger was therefore eligible to serve until 2011.

Exit polls showed Schwarzenegger won White people (63%–32%) and Asian-Americans (62%–37%), while Angelides won African-Americans (70%–27%) and Latinos (56%–39%).

Primary elections (June 6, 2006) 
Bar graph of statewide results

Results by county

The period for candidate nominations closed on March 24, 2006.

Democratic

Candidates 
 Phil Angelides – California State Treasurer; former State Democratic Chair and developer
 Barbara Becnel – Executive Director of Neighborhood House of North Richmond; founder of Save Stanley Tookie Williams campaign
 Joe Brouilette – high school teacher
 Edie Bukewihge – writer and publisher
 Jerald Gerst – physician
 Vibert Greene – engineer
 Frank Macaluso – medical doctor
 Michael Strimling – attorney
 Steve Westly – California State Controller; former Internet executive

The two front-runners for the Democratic nomination were Angelides and California State Controller Steve Westly. A pre-election poll had Westly leading Angelides by six percentage points. The Field Poll conducted on April 17, 2006, showed that both Democratic candidates had low recognition factors amongst the state's electorate, with only 45% having any opinion on Angelides and 40% for Westly. Of registered Democrats surveyed, 59% said they didn't know enough about Angelides to have any opinion about him, with 58% saying the same for Westly. The Los Angeles Times reported that the race for the Democratic nomination was a virtual tie, with Angelides leading Westly by three percentage points (37%–34%), within the 3% margin of error. Unusually, 28% of Democratic voters were undecided, and both candidates tried to earn the undecided vote.

Angelides reported a recent increase in support for his campaign and gained union support as well as support from the "core" liberal constituency. The California Democratic Party endorsed him prior to the primary, despite most polls showing that Westly would fare much better against Schwarzenegger in the general election. However, many registered Democrats believed that Westly had a greater chance of winning against incumbent governor Schwarzenegger and felt that he had a slightly "more positive" image. In the end, Angelides won 47.9% of the vote to Westly's 43.4%. The turnout for the primary, was a record low 33.6%, far below the 38% predicted by the Secretary of State, with the turnout of valid ballots cast on election day at 28%.

Polling

Results

Republican

Candidates 
 Jeffrey Burns – general contractor
 Bill Chambers – railroad switchman
 Robert C. Newman II – psychologist and farmer
 Arnold Schwarzenegger – incumbent Governor of California

Republican Schwarzenegger faced token opposition and won overwhelmingly in the primary held on June 6, 2006.

Results

Third parties

General election

Candidates 
 Phil Angelides (Democratic) – California State Treasurer, Ex-State Democratic Chair & Developer
 Peter Camejo (Green) – 2002/2003 Green Party gubernatorial candidate, 2004 independent vice presidential candidate (Ralph Nader's running mate)
 Janice Jordan (Peace and Freedom) – 2004 Peace and Freedom Party vice presidential candidate (Leonard Peltier's running mate)
 Edward C. Noonan (American Independent) – computer shop owner
 Art Olivier (Libertarian) – former mayor of Bellflower, 2000 Libertarian Party vice presidential candidate (Harry Browne's running mate)
 Arnold Schwarzenegger (Republican) – incumbent Governor of California, actor, businessman

Campaign 
Schwarzenegger's decision to call the 2005 special election, as well as his propositions dealing with teachers' and nurses' unions and other political missteps, brought his approval rating down to 39% by April 2006, though he ended up solidly defeating his opponents. During his first two years, he came under fire from some conservatives for supporting several taxes on Californians, and from some liberals for refusing to sign a bill allowing gay marriage, and his support for several controversial propositions in 2005. Later, Schwarzenegger's popularity with voters rebounded and he won reelection by a wide margin.

Predictions

Polling 

Schwarzenegger v Westly

Results 

Results by county

Results showed Schwarzenegger won 52 counties while Angelides won 6 (Schwarzenegger won an absolute majority in 48 counties and a plurality in 4 counties while Angelides won an absolute majority in 2 counties and a plurality in 4 counties). Schwarzenegger won large majorities in California's rural counties, the populous Southern California counties of San Diego, Orange, Riverside, San Bernardino, and Ventura, as well as populous Sacramento, Fresno, and Kern counties in the Central Valley. The results were closely contested in Los Angeles County and in Bay Area suburban counties. Angelides won substantially only in Alameda and San Francisco counties.

See also 
 United States gubernatorial elections, 2006
 State of California
 Governors of California
 California Victory 2006, Republican field campaign

References

External links

Democratic candidates 
 Phil Angelides
 Barbara Becnel
 Edie Bukewihge
 Steve Westly

Republican candidates 
 Bill Chambers
 Robert C. Newman II
 Arnold Schwarzenegger

Third-party and Independent candidates 
 Peter Camejo
 George Fellows
 Janice Jordan
 Edward Noonan
 Art Olivier

Other sites with relevant information 
 VoteCircle.com Non-partisan resources & vote sharing network for Californians
 Information on the elections from California's Secretary of State
 Video of the debate
 Election Volunteer – Complete List of 2006 Gubernatorial candidates
 Official Homepage of the Governor of California
 2007 Governor's Inaugural Committee

Gubernatorial
2006
California
Arnold Schwarzenegger